Gabriel Mirel Fulga (born 28 February 2004) is a Romanian professional footballer who plays as a forward for Romanian Liga II club Unirea Dej, on loan from FCSB II.

Career statistics

Club

References

2004 births
Living people
People from Orșova
Romanian footballers
Association football forwards
Liga I players
Liga II players
Liga III players
FC Steaua București players
FC Steaua II București players
FC Unirea Dej players